The Zira FK 2015–16 season is Zira's first Azerbaijan Premier League season, and second season in their history. It is their first season with Adil Shukurov as manager, during which they participate in the Azerbaijan Cup as well as the League.

Squad

Transfers

Summer

In:

 

 

Out:

Winter

In:

Out:

Friendlies

Competitions

Azerbaijan Premier League

Results summary

Results

League table

Azerbaijan Cup

Squad statistics

Appearances and goals

|-
|colspan="14"|Players who appeared for Zira but left during the season:

|}

Goal scorers

Disciplinary record

Notes
Qarabağ have played their home games at the Tofiq Bahramov Stadium since 1993 due to the ongoing situation in Quzanlı.

References

Azerbaijani football clubs 2015–16 season
Zira FK